The 2018 Tanduay Athletics Batangas season is the 1st season of the franchise in the Maharlika Pilipinas Basketball League (MPBL).

Key dates
 January 25, 2018: Inaugural season of the Maharlika Pilipinas Basketball League (MPBL) starts.
 April 19, 2018: The team won the league's inaugural championship after defeating the Muntinlupa Cagers, 68–66 in Game 4, to win the best-of-5 series, 3 games to 1, in the recently concluded 2018 Anta Rajah Cup Finals.

Current roster

Anta Rajah Cup

Eliminations

Standings

Game log

|- style="background:#bfb;"
| 1
| January 27
| Valenzuela
| W 73–65
| Val Acuña (18)
| Jhaymo Eguilos (12)
| Paul Varilla (5)
| Muntinlupa Sports Complex
| 1–0

|- style="background:#bfb;"
| 2
| February 3
| Bataan
| W 88–73
| Jhaymo Eguilos (15)
| Jhaymo Eguilos (8)
| Ragasa, Varilla (3)
| Batangas City Coliseum
| 2–0
|- style="background:#bfb;"
| 3
| February 10
| Imus
| W 74–56
| Val Acuña (16)
| Santos, Villamor, Grimaldo, Orera (5)
| Lester Alvarez (5)
| Imus City Sports Complex
| 3–0
|- style="background:#bfb;"
| 4
| February 17
| Navotas
| W 80–71
| Val Acuña (17)
| Jhaymo Eguilos (15)
| Quinto (4)
| Navotas Sports Complex
| 4–0
|- style="background:#bfb;"
| 5
| February 22
| Parañaque
| W 87–79 (OT)
| Val Acuña (19)
| Jhaymo Eguilos (12)
| Lester Alvarez (6)
| Batangas City Coliseum
| 5–0
|- style="background:#bfb;"
| 6 
| February 27
| Muntinlupa
| W 82–77
| Bernabe Teodoro (24)
| Jhaymo Eguilos (13)
| Quinto (4)
| Navotas Sports Complex
| 6–0

|- style="background:#fcc;"
| 7
| March 3
| Bulacan
| L 72–80
| 
|
|
| Imus City Sports Complex
| 6–1
|- style="background:#cfc;"
| 8
| March 8
| Quezon City
| W 77–68
| Bernabe Teodoro (15)
| Jhaymo Eguilos (14)
| Jhaymo Eguilos (4)
| Caloocan Sports Complex
| 7–1
|- style="background:#cfc;"
| 9
| March 13
| Caloocan
| W 86–75
| Lester Alvarez (17)
| Jhaymo Eguilos (7)
| Alvarez, Pasculado, Teodoro (3)
| Batangas City Coliseum
| 8–1

Playoffs

Brackets

Game log

|- style="background:#bfb;"
| 1
| March 20
| Bataan
| W 88–75
| Val Acuña (16)
| Eguilos, Rogado (8)
| Lester Alvarez (10)
| Batangas City Coliseum
| 1–0
|- style="background:#bfb;"
| 2
| March 24
| Bataan
| W 95–82
| Lester Alvarez (17)
| Jhaymo Eguilos (8)
| Lester Alvarez (6)
| Valenzuela Astrodome
| 2–0

|- style="background:#bfb;"
| 3
| April 5
| Valenzuela
| W 80–75
| Paul Varilla (17)
| Kier Quinto (7)
| Lester Alvarez (6)
| Batangas City Coliseum
| 1–0
|- style="background:#bfb;"
| 4
| April 7
| Valenzuela
| W 89–64
| Val Acuña (16)
| Dennice Villamor (10)
| Bernabe Teodoro (3)
| Muntinlupa Sports Complex
| 2–0

|- style="background:#bfb;"
| 5
| April 12
| Muntinlupa
| W 70–64
| Bernabe Teodoro (20)
| Mark Olayon (9)
| Acuña, Teodoro (4)
| Batangas City Coliseum
| 1–0
|- style="background:#bfb;"
| 6
| April 14
| Muntinlupa
| W 78–74
| Jhaymo Eguilos (16)
| Kier Quinto (9)
| Lester Alvarez (7)
| Batangas City Coliseum
| 2–0
|- style="background:#fcc;"
| 7
| April 17
| Muntinlupa
| L 77–82
| Kier Quinto (14)
| Jhaymo Eguilos (12)
| Olayon, Quinto (5)
| Muntinlupa Sports Complex
| 2–1
|- style="background:#bfb;"
| 7
| April 19
| Muntinlupa
| W 68–66
| Moncrief Rogado (14)
| Paul Varilla (9)
| Olayon, Teodoro (4)
| Muntinlupa Sports Complex
| 3–1

Awards
 Val Acuña - Inaugural MVP

Anta Datu Cup

Standings

Game log

|- style="background:#bfb;"
| 1
| June 13
| Quezon City
| W 95–90
| Bong Galanza (28)
| Dennice Villamor (12)
| Lester Alvarez (9)
| Caloocan Sports Complex
| 1–0
|- style="background:#fcc;"
| 2
| June 27
| Bataan
| L 67–81
| Lester Alvarez (17)
| Mark Olayon (9)
| Bernabe Teodoro (4)
| Bataan People's Center
| 1–1

|- style="background:#bfb;"
| 3
| July 10
| Makati
| W 72–65
| Bernabe Teodoro (19)
| Jhaymo Eguilos (10)
| Mark Olayon (7)
| Batangas City Coliseum
| 2–1
|- style="background:#;"
| 4
| July 21
| Valenzuela
| 
| 
| 
| 
| Caloocan Sports Complex
| 2–1

References

Batangas City Athletics
Batangas Tanduay Athletics Season, 2018